Jon Pareles (born October 25, 1953) is an American journalist who is the chief popular music critic in the arts section of The New York Times.

Early life and education 
Pareles was born in Connecticut. He played jazz flute and piano, and graduated from Yale University with a degree in music. He began working as a music critic in 1977.

Career 
In the 1970s, he was an associate editor of Crawdaddy!, where he published his first works (outside school publications); and in the 1980s, an associate editor at Rolling Stone and the music editor at The Village Voice. He started contributing to The Times in 1982. He reviews popular music in the arts section of The Times.

Publications

References

External links 
 Jon Pareles at The New York Times
 

1953 births
20th-century American journalists
20th-century American male writers
20th-century American non-fiction writers
21st-century American journalists
21st-century American male writers
21st-century American non-fiction writers
American male journalists
American male non-fiction writers
American music critics
Critics employed by The New York Times
Journalists from Connecticut
Journalists from New York City
Living people
Rolling Stone people
The Village Voice people
Yale University alumni